Leticia Perdigón (born Guadalupe Leticia Perdigón Labrador on August 7, 1956, in Mexico City, Mexico) is a Mexican film and television actress who has appeared in more than forty TV shows and fifty films since 1973.

Selected filmography

Television

References

External links

1956 births
Living people
Mexican telenovela actresses
Mexican television actresses
Mexican film actresses
20th-century Mexican actresses
21st-century Mexican actresses
Actresses from Mexico City
People from Mexico City